The Vasilyev Brothers State Prize of the RSFSR was an annual State Prize established by the Council of Ministers of the RSFSR in 1965. Three Vasilyev Brothers prizes were awarded annually from 1966 until 1990 for cinematographic works of all kinds (fiction, documentary, non-fiction and animated) and for work by screenwriters, directors, actors, cameramen, artists, sound engineers and consultants. A winner was awarded the title "Laureate of RSFSR State Prize" and was presented with a diploma and badge of honour.

The Vasilyev brothers were two unrelated Russian Soviet film directors, Georgi Vasiliev (Russian: Георгий Николаевич Васильев, 1899 – 1946) and Sergei Vasiliev (Russian: Сергей Дмитриевич Васильев, 1900 – 1959).

See also
 State Prize of the Russian Federation

Civil awards and decorations of Russia
Russian film awards